The Critics' Choice Television Award for Best Guest Performer in a Comedy Series is one of the award categories presented annually by the Critics' Choice Television Awards (BTJA) (US) to recognize the work done by television actors. It was introduced in 2012. The winners are selected by a group of television critics that are part of the Broadcast Television Critics Association.

Winners and nominees

2010s

Multiple nominations
2 nominations
 Becky Ann Baker

See also
 Primetime Emmy Award for Outstanding Guest Actor in a Comedy Series
 Primetime Emmy Award for Outstanding Guest Actress in a Comedy Series

References

Critics' Choice Television Awards